Kathisma (Greek: κάθισμα) may refer to:
the Greek word for chair, seat, throne 
the "Emperor's lodge" in the Hippodrome of Constantinople
in Eastern Orthodox liturgy, kathisma, a division of the Psalter.
Ecclesia Kathismatis, the Church of the Seat of Mary aka Church of the Kathisma or Old Kathisma, between  Jerusalem and Bethlehem

See also
Cathedra
Cathedral (disambiguation)
Akathist